Raghunathpur is a census town in Buxar District in the Indian state of Bihar. It is approximately 41 km from Buxar.

Geography
It has an average elevation of 58 metres (190 feet).

Demographics
 India census, Raghunathpur had a population of 5601. Males constitute 55% of the population and females 45%. Raghunathpur has an average literacy rate of 53%, lower than the national average of 59.5%: male literacy is 62%, and female literacy is 42%. In Raghunathpur, 18% of the population is under 6 years of age.

References

See also

Cities and towns in Buxar district